The Democratic National Platform 2000 was a political party in Suriname, that was founded and led by Jules Wijdenbosch.
At the legislative elections (25 May 2005), the DNP 2000 was part of the People's Alliance for Progress that won over 14.5% of the popular vote and five out of 51 seats in the National Assembly.

References

Defunct political parties in Suriname